Grosmont may refer to:

 Grosmont, Monmouthshire, a village in Monmouthshire, Wales
 Grosmont Castle, a ruined castle in Grosmont, Monmouthshire
 Grosmont, North Yorkshire, a small village and civil parish in the Scarborough district of North Yorkshire, England
 Grosmont Priory, a priory in North Yorkshire, England
 Grosmont railway station
 Grosmont, Alberta, a hamlet in Alberta, Canada
 Grosmont Formation, a stratigraphical unit in the Western Canadian Sedimentary Basin

People 
 Henry of Grosmont, Duke of Lancaster (–1361), an English statesman, diplomat, soldier, and Christian writer, named for Grosmont Castle

See also
 Grossmont (disambiguation)